Mateus Cole Ward (born January 18, 1999) is an American actor. He is known for his roles as Jake Sanders in the CBS television series Hostages, and as Dustin Maker in the TNT television series Murder in the First.  He is also known for his role as the older Stevie Botwin in the series finale of the Showtime comedy-drama series Weeds, and for his recurring role as Marcus Davenport on the Disney XD fantasy series Lab Rats.

Personal life
Ward was born in Burbank, California, the son of an Italian immigrant mother and American father of English, Norwegian, Danish, and Scots-Irish descent.  In 2004, his family moved to Lahaina, Hawaii on the island of Maui, where he lived for 5 years, and then returned to Los Angeles in 2009.

Career
Mateus' television debut came in 2010, where he won the role of Lyle DeLilly on Criminal Minds. Ward caught the eye of director Larry Charles, and he was cast as a series regular, the son of Ana Ortiz, in the 20th Century Fox sitcom pilot Outnumbered with Cheech Marin.

In 2011, Ward was asked to guest star on the sports comedy series Sports Show with Norm Macdonald on Comedy Central, for which he was nominated for a Young Artist Award and won an OMNI Youth Music and Actor Award, Outstanding Actor, in the 12- to 18-year-old category.  Ward went on to land the role of Carl in the comedy-drama Parenthood.

In April 2012, Mateus landed a recurring guest star role as Marcus Davenport on the teen sitcom Lab Rats on Disney XD.  Then he was offered the role of young Franky in his first feature film Lonely Boy, where he portrays a teenager with schizophrenia.  In September of that year, he was cast in the two-part series finale of the comedy-drama Weeds, which aired on Showtime.  Ward won a Young Artist Award for his portrayal of Stevie Botwin.

In 2013, Ward appeared in the police procedural drama television series NCIS on CBS. In the eleventh episode, titled Shabbot Shalom, Ward played the role of Austin, a young teen who discovers a dead body. Mateus was also a series regular in the Jerry Bruckheimer television series Hostages produced by Warner Bros. Television for CBS, portraying Jake Sanders, the son of Dr. Ellen Sanders, portrayed by Toni Collette, and Brian Sanders, portrayed by Tate Donovan.  In 2015, Ward was a series regular playing Dustin Maker on the Steven Bochco and Eric Lodal television series Murder in the First with Taye Diggs and Kathleen Robertson on TNT.

In 2016, Ward signed on to play the leading role of Clyde Thompson in the film The Meanest Man in Texas, a feature film adaptation of the book by the same name which was released theatrically.  He is a producer and plays Levi in the feature film Relish

Filmography

Film

Television

Video games

References

External links

Male actors from California
American male child actors
American male film actors
Living people
People from Burbank, California
1999 births
21st-century American male actors
American people of Danish descent
American people of English descent
American people of Italian descent
American people of Norwegian descent
American people of Scotch-Irish descent